The 2012 Pan American Aerobic Gymnastics Championships were held in Acapulco, Mexico, November 21–26, 2012. The competition was organized by the Mexican Gymnastics Federation, and approved by the International Gymnastics Federation.

Medalists

References

Pan American Aerobic Gymnastics Championships
International gymnastics competitions hosted by Mexico
Pan American Aerobic Gymnastics Championships
Pan American Gymnastics Championships
Pan American Aerobic Gymnastics Championships